The Manifesto of the Oppressed Black Mauritanian was published in April, 1986 by the African Liberation Forces of Mauritania, a paramilitary group which promoted the rights of the oppressed Black African majority by Arabo-Berber minority in Mauritania. The manifesto details the racial discrimination against the Black African majority by the Arabophone minority in Mauritania. It encouraged the black majority of Mauritania to overthrow the military junta installed by Mohamed Khouna Ould Haidallah and establish an egalitarian regime.

Contents 
The Manifesto of the Oppressed Black Mauritanian was written in French, and mainly targeted the sympathy of non-Mauritanian audiences.  The manifesto focuses on the discrimination against Black African Mauritanians by the Arabphone political elite and minority. It documents the racial segregation in every sector of public life. The manifesto contains details about the discrimination against the Black population in the educational system, the army, the mass media and the judicial system. The manifesto urged the Black majority of Mauritania to use any means necessary in order to overthrow the Arabophone military junta.

Trial and effects of the Manifesto on Mauritania 
In September 1986, the Arab military regime of Mauritania arrested thirty-six Mauritanians of Black African origin for the publication and the distribution of the manifesto. Twenty one of them were brought to trial on charges of "undermining national unity" and "making propaganda of a racial or ethnic character". Among them were Ibrahima Moctar Sarr and many other prominent members of the academic life of Mauritania. Many of the accused individuals were subject to torture during interrogation by the Mauritanian police. 

The defendants were denied judicial defense, and were allowed to contact lawyers only on the day of the trial. The trial was conducted in Arabic, although only three of the accused could understand or speak Arabic. During the trial all of the defendants pleaded not guilty, but all were convicted on all counts. The convictions varied from six-month to ten-year prison sentences, exile, and loss of civil rights. 

In October 1986, ten other Black Africans were arrested on charges of organization of protests against the trial of September, of being members of the African Liberation Forces of Mauritania and of raising funds for the families of the defendants of the September trials. As a consequence the Arab military junta introduced and established the Islamic law, and increased the discrimination against the Black African community. In October 1987, fifty-one Black African officers were arrested on charges of insurrection, three of which were executed.

References 

African and Black nationalism in Africa
Politics of Mauritania
Political manifestos
1986 in Mauritania
1986 in politics
1986 documents